Active is the 22nd album  by the jazz fusion group Casiopea recorded and released in 1992. The album was recorded in Australia, Also where Casiopea's Live Album "Made in Melbourne" (and "We Want More", which continues the Live Set) was recorded.

Track listing

Personnel
CASIOPEA are
Issei Noro – Electric guitar, Fretless guitar
Minoru Mukaiya – Keyboards
Yoshihiro Naruse – Electric Bass, Fretless bass
Masaaki Hiyama – Drums

Guest musician 
Alex Pertout – Percussions
Doron Kipen – Fairlight Operator

Production
Sound Produced – Casiopea
Recording & Mixing Engineer – Ross Cockle
Assistant Engineer – Mathew Thomas
Additional Recording Assistant Engineer – Hideyuki Hirata
Mastering engineer – Tohru Kotetsu
Supervisor – Tadashi Nomura
Producer – Ryoichi Okuda
Executive Producer – Yoshiaki Mizutani
Artists Manager – Takashi E. Norway
Promotion Director – Hiroharu Sato
Technician – Yasushi "Mayuge" Horiuchi, Shigeo Matsuyama

Art Director – Satoshi Yanagisawa
Photograph – Junichi Takahashi

Release history

External links

References

1992 albums
Casiopea albums